Gerrie Pienaar (born 28 April 1959) is a South African cricket umpire. He has stood in matches in the 2016–17 Sunfoil 3-Day Cup and the 2016–17 CSA Provincial One-Day Challenge tournaments.

In October 2019, he was selected as one of three match referee for the 2019 ICC T20 World Cup Qualifier.

References

External links
 

1959 births
Living people
South African cricket umpires
Sportspeople from Johannesburg